L'Estocq is a French surname. Notable people with the surname include:

Jean Armand de L'Estocq (1692–1767), French adventurer
Anton Wilhelm von L'Estocq (1738–1815), Prussian general
Johann Ludwig von L'Estocq, brother of Jean

French-language surnames